Zareh may refer to:
 Zareh, Hamadan
 Zareh, Kerman